Pentre Halkyn is a small village in Flintshire, Wales.  It is situated approximately two miles from Holywell, and is off Junction 32 of the A55 North Wales Expressway. It has a quarry, a small hotel, and a local shop. The village borders on the Halkyn Mountain  Site of Special Scientific Interest and Special Area of Conservation.

Village
Pentre Halkyn is small hillside village, with a population of approximately 1,100. The village features a shop, a Football Club Halkyn United F.C. and Halkyn Cricket Club, and a play area. It has one main road running through the middle that comes off the A55 and leads down to the town of Holywell. Pentre Halkyn also has a hotel close to the A55 called the Springfield Hotel and Health Club. Also a cafe known as Billie Jean's, named after the hit Michael Jackson song. The village sits on the side of a steep incline. Views of North East Wales and Merseyside are visible from the village, and on a clear day even Blackpool Tower can be seen. Local folk-lore speaks of a monster that haunts this village called "Sassy" by the villagers. It is described as a long haired woolly beast, that steals sheep from the mountainside and feasts on them within its cave.

Mining and quarrying 
Lead ore was first mined in Roman times and was then smelted at Flint. The lead that was produced there was stamped with the inscription Deceangli (Welsh: Tegeingl), which was the name of the Celtic British Iron Age tribe occupying the area.

In the 17th century an intensive period of lead mining begun, drawing the interest and the investment of the London Lead Company and various Derbyshire mining entrepreneurs. Shortly after, new rich veins were discovered and these were quickly exploited, bringing a large number of skilled miners especially from Derbyshire to live in Halkyn. A road, Buxton Lane, is named after one of the main towns of Derbyshire. The lane leads to the Billins mine, which is immediately to the south of the Pentre Halkyn to Babell Road.

The existing villages of Pentre Halkyn, Halkyn and Rhosesmor grew rapidly in these times as more miners came to the area. New communities were developed as the villages grew, to house the newcomers. This resulted in the development of the villages and hamlets of Rhes-y-Cae, Moel-y-Crio, Wern-y-Gaer, Berthddu, Pant-y-go and Windmill. By the 19th century the lead mines were well developed and concerns arose necessitating mining techniques. This raised the problem of flooding due to the digging of deep drainage tunnels, with the most important being the Milwr tunnel that leads from Loggerheads to Bagillt.

Mining ended in the 1970s but quarrying is still an important local industry with two new large limestone quarries dominating the surrounding area. As a result of these quarries opening, new institutions were needed to support the community with new churches, chapels, a school and village halls being opened in the 19th century.

Trig point
The trig point at the pinnacle of Halkyn Mountain is 290 metres above sea level. On a clear day it is possible to see Blackpool Tower in Lancashire, about 50 miles away.

Notable people
Ann Clwyd - Cynon Valley MP

References

External links 

The History of Halkyn Mountain
The Halkyn Mountain website

Villages in Flintshire